European route E 22 (E 22) is a west–east European route, running from Holyhead in the United Kingdom, through the Netherlands, Germany, Sweden and Latvia, to Ishim in Russia.

The highway is maintained by Rijkswaterstaat.

Route description

In the Netherlands, E 22 starts in southwestern Amsterdam at De Nieuwe Meer Interchange where A4 starts its course and branches off from the A10, the ring road around Amsterdam. E 22 runs north concurrent with Ring A10. After a few exits A5 joins E 22/A10 just before E 22/A10, concurrent, pass under the North Sea Canal using a group of tunnels called the first and second Coen Tunnel. Through the Coen Tunnels, E 22/A10/ have extra lanes only used in rush hour. Shortly after they get to Coenplein-Noord Interchange, where Ring A10 continues east and E 22 branches of to the northwest, now concurrent with A8. After the first and only exit of the section where E 22 and A8 run concurrently, A8 has extra lanes used in rush hour only, these extra rush hour lanes are also present on the next road, A7, until Purmerend, that crosses A8 at Zaandam Interchange, and that E 22 starts running concurrently with from there on to the northeast. After running over the Afsluitdijk, the road continues to the southeast, passing by Bolsward and Sneek until it reaches the town of Joure. In Sneek though, A7 turns into N7 to function as the southern part of the ring road around Sneek, with a lowered speed limit. In Joure, A6 joins E 22/A7 from the south on a traffic circle which also functions as an exit allowing traffic from Joure to enter the motorway. It is the last traffic circle in the Netherlands on a motorway with no grade separated ramps, though it will be upgraded from 2015 to 2017 to half a stack interchange. 

From Joure E 22/A7 continues to the north east, passing by Heerenveen and Drachten, where near both cities it crosses A32 and N31 respectively, both of the interchanges are built as cloverleaf interchanges. After passing by Drachten, the road continues to Groningen, where it touches the border between the Groningen and Drenthe provinces, but doesn't enter Drenthe. In Groningen, A7 becomes N7 and functions as the southern part of the ring road around Groningen, and is designed as freeway with some at grade intersections, and traffic lights at Julianaplein Interchange, where E 232/A28 arrives from the south and has its northern terminus here in Groningen. N7 continues running to the east in Groningen until it reaches N46 at Interchange Euvelgunne, where you have to make a right to stay on E 22/N7 going to the southeast. Before that, it passes by Hoogezand-Sappemeer and Winschoten, and between the two it crosses N33 at a partial cloverleaf interchange. Continuing east it finally arrives at the town of Nieuweschans, located at the Dutch side of the border. This is the eastern terminus of A7, and E 22 continues east in Germany, here concurrent with the German A280.

History

European route alignment history 

 In 1950, when the e-roads were first aligned, part of E10 and part of E35 followed the current alignment of E22 in the Netherlands. E10 from Amsterdam to Groningen, though in Friesland following N31 / A31 instead of N7 / A7 as E22 does nowadays. And E35 from Groningen to the German border. E22, back then, ran from Berlin in Germany to Przemysl in the USSR.
 In 1954, E10, originally running from Paris, through Brussels, Antwerpen, Breda, Rotterdam, Amsterdam, Leeuwarden and Groningen, now had its Northern terminus in Amsterdam and thereby no longer followed any section of the current E22 in the Netherlands. 
 In 1963, E10 was back to its 1950 alignment, putting its northern terminus back in Groningen and following the current alignment of E22.
 In 1975, E22 was realigned from its route that it followed then, from Germany to the USSR, to its current alignment from Amsterdam to the German border east of Groningen (the part in the Netherlands). E10, the road that used to follow E22's current alignment was no longer in use (it would be used in a few years, but not on E22's current alignment). E35 was realigned to a totally different course from Hook of Holland to Arnhem in the Netherlands (and to Cologne, Frankfurt am Main, Basel and Rome beyond that).

Dutch underlying road construction history
In 1950, when E10 and E35 followed the course of current E22, most of the underlying road wasn't constructed yet. There were only the N7 from Hoorn-Noord to Lambertschaag, from Middenmeer in North Holland to Bolsward in Friesland over the Afsluitdijk, from Sneek to Heerenveen and from Sappemeer to Scheemda, and the provincial road S14 from Zaandijk to Purmerend-Zuid, all with at grade intersections and one lane in each direction.

In North Holland 
From 1966 to 1975, motorway A10, the ring road around Amsterdam was constructed with grade separated intersections and mostly three lanes in each direction between E22's western terminus in the Netherlands at Interchange De Nieuwe Meer and Interchange Coenplein (now known as Interchange Coenplein-Noord), where E22 will stop following A10 and starts running over A8's alignment to the northwest. Between 1966 and 1968 A8, the road E22 runs concurrently with between Amsterdam and Zaandam, was constructed with grade separated intersections and two lanes in each direction. In 1959, a missing link between two parts of N7 was constructed, from Lambertschaag to Middenmeer, with at grade intersections and one lane in each direction. Between 1976 and 1982, the last missing link in N7/A7 in North Holland was constructed as A7, in parts, between Purmerend-Zuid and Hoorn-Noord, with grade separated intersections and two lanes in each direction. By 1985, the entire road from Interchange Zaandam to Zurich, east of the Afsluitdijk, the part of N7/A7 in North Holland, was upgraded to A7 with grade separated intersections and two lanes in each direction.

Between 2007 and 2014, a second tunnel, the second Coentunnel, under the IJ was constructed, widening A10 here to three lanes in each direction with two additional reversible lanes to help traffic flow in rush hour.

A8 between Coenplein Interchange and Zaandam Interchange was widened to three lanes in each direction in 1990, and then widened again to four lanes in each direction in 2013. In 2015, a fifth southbound lane was added between  Zaandam Interchange and Coenplein Interchange, and northbound between a gas station just north of exit Oostzaan and Zaandam Interchange, which are narrower and only opened in rush hour.

Between Zurich and Joure 
In Friesland, N7 was extended east beyond Bolsward to Nijland as A7 with grade separated intersections and two lanes in each direction. Between 1972 and 1978, all of N7 between Zurich and Joure Interchange was opened and/or upgraded to A7 with grade separated intersections and two lanes in each direction, except for the section that was the southern part of the ring road around Sneek, which remained N7 with a much lower maximum speed, though with grade separated intersections as well. The part of N7 that functions as the ring road around Sneek was upgraded again between 2008 and 2010, and now has two lanes in each direction.

Between Joure and the German border 
Between 1956 and 1960, N7 was extended east from Heerenveen to Groningen, and the part between Sappemeer and Scheemda was also extended in both directions between 1955 and 1957 and would then run between Hoogezand and Winschoten, all with at grade intersections and one lane in each direction. In 1969 N7 was opened between Winschoten and the German border near Nieuweschans with grade separated intersections and one lane in each direction. Between 1972 and 1973, the missing link between Groningen and Hoogezand was opened as A7 with grade separated intersections and two lanes in each direction, though with a slightly different course through Groningen than it has nowadays, it used to go over the Europaweg, until Euvelgunne Interchange was opened in 2009. Between 1972 and 1983, N7 between Heerenveen and western Groningen was upgraded to A7 with grade separated intersections and two lanes in each direction. Between 1988 and 1993, N7 between Hoogezand and the German border was upgraded to A7 with grade separated intersections and two lanes in each direction. It was also then realigned to go north of Scheemda instead of through it. In 2009, as before mentioned, Euvelgunne Interchange was opened, and N7 would now approach this interchange from the west and then go south to Engelbert, with two lanes in each direction, grade separated intersections, but a lowered speed, meaning it would still be called N7.

Future 
Owing to increasing numbers of commuters, a number of upgrades will be seen before 2030 from the western terminus of E22, where it is concurrent with A10, to the city of Purmerend, comprising the roads A10, A8 and A7. The Coentunnels currently only use 8 of their 10 lanes, when A7 and A8 will be upgraded, all lanes in the Coentunnel might have to be used to funnel through all the extra traffic. A8 will see an upgrade to six lanes in each direction between Coenplein Interchange and Zaandam interchange. Between Zaandam Interchange and exit Purmerend Zuid, A7 will be upgraded from its current two lanes in each direction to four lanes in each direction. Money for the project is already reserved by the Dutch government and will be available in 2023.

Interchange Joure, where A6 meets E22, that is concurrent with A7 there, is currently build as a traffic circle. It has no grade separated parts which results in some traffic being favoured over other traffic. This is why a new interchange is being constructed between 2015 and 2017, which will be half a stack interchange. It will be placed southwest of the current traffic circle and traffic from A6 from the south will get onto A7 without having to use an exit, thus being the dominant route. When arriving from the west on A7/E22, this means you have to use ramps to stay on A7/E22. A new exit, Joure, will be created just south of where the current traffic circle is now, since an exit used to be incorporated in the traffic circle.

Exit list

See also

References

022
Motorways in Friesland
Motorways in Groningen (province)
Motorways in North Holland
Transport in Amsterdam
Transport in Groningen (city)
Transport in Midden-Groningen
Transport in Oldambt (municipality)